A vision mixer is a device used to select between several different live video sources and, in some cases, compositing live video sources together to create visual effects.

In most of the world, both the equipment and its operator are called a vision mixer or video mixer; however, in the United States, the equipment is called a video switcher, production switcher or video production switcher, and its operator is known as a technical director (TD).

The role of the vision mixer for video is similar to what a mixing console does for audio. Typically a vision mixer would be found in a video production environment such as a production control room of a television studio, production truck or post-production facility.

Capabilities and usage 
Besides hard cuts (switching directly between two input signals), mixers can also generate a variety of transitions, from simple dissolves to pattern wipes. Additionally, most vision mixers can perform keying operations (called mattes in this context) and generate color signals. Vision mixers may include digital video effects (DVE) and still store functionality. Most vision mixers are targeted at the professional market, with newer analog models having component video connections and digital ones using serial digital interface (SDI) or SMPTE 2110. They are used in live television, such as outside broadcasting, with video tape recording (VTR) and video servers for linear video editing, even though the use of vision mixers in video editing has been largely supplanted by computer-based non-linear editing systems.

Older professional mixers worked with composite video, analog signal inputs. There were a number of consumer video switchers with composite video or S-Video. These are often used for VJing, presentations, and small multi-camera productions.

Operation 

The most basic part of a vision mixer is a bus, which is a signal path consisting of multiple video inputs that feeds a single output. On the panel, a bus is represented by a row of buttons; pressing one of those buttons selects the video signal in that bus. Older video mixers had two equivalent buses (called the A and B bus; such a mixer is known as an A/B mixer), and one of these buses could be selected as the main out (or program) bus. Most modern mixers, however, have one bus that is always the program bus, the second main bus being the preview (sometimes called preset) bus. These mixers are called flip-flop mixers, since the selected source of the preview and program buses can be exchanged. Some switchers allow the operator to switch between these two modes. Both the preview and program bus usually have their own video monitors displaying the video selected in their respective buses.

Another main feature of a vision mixer is the transition lever, also called a T-bar or Fader Bar. This lever, similar to an audio fader, is used to transition between two buses. Note that in a flip-flop mixer, the position of the main transition lever does not indicate which bus is active, since the program bus is always the active or hot bus. Instead of moving the lever by hand, a button (commonly labeled "mix", "auto" or "auto trans") can be used, which performs the transition over a user-defined period of time. Another button, usually labeled "cut" or "take", swaps the preview signal to the program signal instantaneously. The type of transition used can be selected in the transition section. Common transitions include dissolves (similar to an audio cross fade) and pattern wipes.

A third bus used for compositing is the key bus. A mixer can have more than one key bus, but often they share only one set of buttons. Here, one signal can be selected for keying over the program (or background) bus. The digital on-screen graphic image that will be seen in the program is called the fill, while the mask used to cut the key's translucence is called the source. This source, e.g. chrominance, luminance, pattern (the internal pattern generator is used) or split (an additional video signal similar to an alpha channel is used) and can be selected in the keying section of the mixer. Note that instead of the key bus, other video sources can be selected for the fill signal, but the key bus is usually the most convenient method for selecting a key fill. Usually, a key is turned on and off the same way a transition is. For this, the transition section can be switched from program mode to key mode. Often, the transition section allows background video and one or more keyers to be transitioned separately or in any combination with one push of the "auto" button.

These three main buses together form the basic mixer section called Program/Preset or P/P. Bigger production mixers may have a number of additional sections of this type, which are called Mix/Effects (M/E for short) sections and numbered. Any M/E section can be selected as a source in the P/P stage, making the mixer operations much more versatile, since effects or keys can be composed "offline" in an M/E and then go "live" at the push of one button.

After the P/P section, there is another keying stage called the downstream keyer (DSK). It is mostly used for keying text or graphics and has its own cut and mix buttons. The signal before the DSK keyer is called clean feed. After the DSK is one last stage that overrides any signal with black, usually called Fade To Black or FTB.

Modern vision mixers may also have additional functions, such as serial communications
with the ability to use proprietary communications protocols, control auxiliary channels for routing video signals to other sources than the program out, macro programming, and DVE capabilities. Mixers are often equipped with effects memory registers, which can store a snapshot of any part of a complex mixer configuration and then recall the setup with one button press.

Setup 

Since vision mixers combine various video signals such as VTRs and professional video cameras, it is very important that all these sources are in proper synchronization with one another. In professional analog facilities all the equipment is "genlocked" with black and burst or tri-level sync from a video-signal generator. The signals which cannot be synchronized (either because they originate outside the facility or because the particular equipment doesn't accept external sync) must go through a frame synchronizer. Some vision mixers have internal “frame-syncs” or they can be a separate piece of equipment, such as a "time base corrector". If the mixer is used for video editing, the editing console (which usually controls the vision mixer remotely) must also be synched. Most larger vision mixers divide the control panel from the actual hardware that performs the mixer functions because of noise, temperature and cable length considerations. With such mixers, the control panel is located in the production control room, while the main unit, to which all cables are connected, is often located in a machine room alongside the other hardware.

Manufacturers 

 AnalogWay (manufacturer) 
 Barco (manufacturer)
 Blackmagic Design: ATEM Production Switchers
 Broadcast Pix
 ColosseoEAS
 Datavideo
 Evertz Microsystems
 EVS Broadcast Equipment: Dyvi 
 Focus Enhancements (Videonics)
 FOR-A
 Grass Valley
 Guramex
 Kramer Electronics Ltd.
 NewTek (Video Toaster), (TriCaster)
 Panasonic
 Philips
 Roland Corporation, Roland Systems Group
 Ross Video
 Snell (former, bought by Grass Valley)
 Sony

See also 
 Audio router
 Mixing console
 Patch panel
 Software vision mixer
 Video router

References

Sources

 
 
 
 Luff, John: "Production switchers ". Broadcast Engineering, November 1, 2002
 Moore, Jeff: "Production Switcher Primer ". Ross Video Production Switcher Primer.
 VideoSolutions group "ODYSSEY Mixers Family  ".
 Monarch Innovative technology pvt ltd" ".
thameside.tv Sony Vision Mixer DVS-7000

External links 

 Outsite Broadcast Director setting up their vision mixer for an upcoming sports OB
 Outside broadcast director using vision mixer during recreation of 1970s sports coverage
 Video equipment collection

Film and video technology
Television terminology
Television technology